Phasianoidea is a superfamily of birds of the order of the Galliformes.

Taxonomy

Description 
The superfamily was described in 1825 by the Irish zoologist Nicholas Aylward Vigors.

Etymology 
The name Phasianoidea is formed by the union of the elements of scientific Latin Phasian- and -oidea. The first is the genitive root of the name of its type genus, Phasianus; and the second is the ending -oidea, neutral plural of -oideus, derived from ancient Greek εἴδος eidos, 'aspect', 'appearance', 'form', with the union vowel -o-, used in the formation of numerous names of orders and superfamilies of animals. Literally: 'those who look like pheasants'.

Families 

The superfamily is subdivided into three families:

Superfamily Phasianoidea Vigors, 1825 – 225 species
 Family Numididae Reichenbach, 1850 – 6 species
 Family Odontophoridae Gould, 1844 – 34 species
 Family Phasianidae Vigors, 1825 – 185 species

References

Bibliography 
 del Hoyo, J.; Elliot, A. & Sargatal, J. (1994): "New World Vultures to Guineafowl".  In Handbook of the Birds of the World. Volume 2. Barcelona: Lynx Edicions. .

External links 
 Phasianoidea in ADW.

Galliformes
Bird superfamilies